Battering can refer to:
Batter (cooking)
Battery (crime)
Battering ram

See also
Domestic violence